Daniil Yakovlevich Khrabrovitsky (June 28, 1923, Rostov-on-Don – March 1, 1980, Moscow) was a Soviet screenwriter and film director.

Filmography 
 1959: Все начинается с дороги
 1959: Исправленному верить
 1961: Nine Days in One Year (Девять дней одного года)
 1961: Чистое небо
 1965: Roll Call
 1969: Почтовый
 1972: Taming of the Fire (Укрощение огня)
 1975: Повесть о человеческом сердце
 1979: Поэма о крыльях

External links 
 

1923 births
1980 deaths
Film people from Rostov-on-Don
Soviet screenwriters
Male screenwriters
Soviet film directors
Recipients of the Vasilyev Brothers State Prize of the RSFSR
Communist Party of the Soviet Union members
Burials at Kuntsevo Cemetery